Band-e Amir  ("Dam of the Amir") or Band-e Azodi, is a dam 20 km northeast of the city of Shiraz in Iran, built by the Buyid ruler Adud al-Dawla in 975. It still remains in use till this day.

References

Sources 
 
 

Dams in Fars Province
Weirs
Buyid dynasty
Buildings and structures in Fars Province